Andreyevka is a rural locality (a village) in Novokarmalinsky Selsoviet, Miyakinsky District, Bashkortostan, Russia. The population was 9 as of 2010. There is 1 street.

Geography 
Andreyevka is located 10 km north of Kirgiz-Miyaki (the district's administrative centre) by road. Zirikly is the nearest rural locality.

References 

Rural localities in Miyakinsky District